John Pandeni constituency, formerly known as Soweto is a constituency in the Khomas Region of Namibia. In 2008, it was renamed after John Pandeni, a member of the South West Africa People's Organization (SWAPO) and its militant wing, the People's Liberation Army of Namibia (PLAN). Pandeni was the first regional councilor for the former Soweto constituency and the first governor of Khomas. This constituency is inside the city of Windhoek in the formerly all-Black suburb of Katutura. It had a population of 15,121 in 2011, up from 13,865 in 2001. , it has 14,758 registered voters.

Politics
The constituency was won by SWAPO in the 2004 regional council elections. Rakel Jacob became councillor by more than two-thirds of the total votes. Also in the 2015 regional election SWAPO won by a landslide. Jakob  was reelected with 2,996 votes, followed by Steve Kevanhu of the Rally for Democracy and Progress (RDP, 375 votes). The SWAPO candidate also won the 2020 regional election, albeit by a much smaller margin. Shaalukeni Moonde received 1,696 votes, followed by Abraham Nakantinda of the Independent Patriots for Change (IPC), an opposition party formed in August 2020, with 827 votes and Duminga Ndala of the Landless People's Movement (LPM, also a new party, registered in 2018) with 825 votes.

References

Constituencies of Khomas Region
Windhoek
States and territories established in 1992
1992 establishments in Namibia